Suggestive dialogue can refer to:

Innuendo, a remark or question that implies something, usually derogatory, about the subject without expressly stating it.
 Suggestive dialogue, one of the criteria used to determine TV Parental Guidelines in the United States.